The Canada Water Wells, near jct. of Canada-Toto Rd.& Canada -Toto Loop
Barrigada-Mangilao, GU, are water works that were built in 1937.

They have also been known as Kanada, as Chochugu' and as To'tu.  The structures were listed on the National Register of Historic Places in 2008;  the listing included two contributing structures.

A U.S. Geological Survey report in 2003 described the water of Guam, including identifying that there are approximately 180 water wells serving the needs of Guam, drawing on a lens-shaped aquifer.

References 

Buildings and structures on the National Register of Historic Places in Guam
Buildings and structures completed in 1937
1937 establishments in Guam
Barrigada, Guam
Water supply infrastructure on the National Register of Historic Places
Water in Guam